John Kinloch Anderson (January 3, 1924 – October 13, 2015) was Professor of Classics and Ancient History and Mediterranean Archaeology Emeritus at University of California, Berkeley.

Biography 
John Kinloch Anderson was born in Multan, Punjab on January 3, 1924. He obtained his secondary education at Trinity College Glenalmond from 1937 to 1942. He served in Royal Highland Regiment during World War II, serving in campaigns in Europe and Asia. After the war, he studied Classics at Christ Church, Oxford, where he received his bachelor’s degree in 1949. From 1949–50, he attended the British School at Athens. He was a MacMillan Fellow at Yale University from 1950 to 1952. Anderson worked at various excavation sites in Greece and Turkey, such as Corinth, Chios, and Smyrna (Izmir).

Beginning in 1953, he taught at University of Otago in Dunedin, New Zealand. While in New Zealand, he met his wife Esperance, with whom he had three children. In 1958, they moved to Berkeley, California where he taught at UC Berkeley until his retirement in 1993. He was curator of the Lowie Museum (Phoebe A. Hearst Museum of Anthropology). He died in 2015.

Bibliography 
He was an experienced rider, which inspired him to write the seminal work Ancient Greek Horsemanship (1961). It covered horsemanship in the Mediterranean from the Bronze Age until the Muslim conquests of the early Middle Ages. As part of his research, Anderson personally attempted some of the riding procedures described in the book. At the time of its publication, the book was praised in a number of academic reviews, including The Classical Review and Classical Philology.

In 1970, he published Military Theory and Practice in the Age of Xenophon (1970), about the life of Xenophon and Greek warfare during his lifetime. The book dealt with the technical aspects of Classical Greek warfare, including the training, organization and tactics employed by Greek armies, particularly the Spartan army. It covered the development of peltasts in especially deep detail. Anderson used a combination of archaeological and literary sources, such as the Cyropaedia, as the basis for his conclusions. The book has been well received for its comprehensive and approachable handling of Greek warfare, which was at the time an understudied field. The Classical Journal called it "an important and useful contribution to the understanding of Greek military tactics." Its first print was noted to contain a number of typographical errors.

Afterwards, he penned the more general Xenophon (1974), and edited the volume Funerary Symbolism in Apulian Vase-Painting in 1976. He wrote Hunting in the Ancient World (1985) which is one of the most comprehensive works on the topic of hunting practices in ancient Greek and Roman culture. The book incorporates evidence from Greco-Roman literature, and also takes into account the hunting traditions of nearby cultures such as the Persians and Assyrians.

References 

1924 births
2015 deaths
People from Multan
20th-century American historians
Classical scholars of the University of California, Berkeley
Nationality missing
Alumni of Christ Church, Oxford
People educated at Glenalmond College